Tours-sur-Marne (literally Tours on Marne) is a commune in the Marne department in north-eastern France.

Champagne
The village's vineyards are located in the Vallée de la Marne subregion of Champagne, and are classified as Grand Cru (100%) in the Champagne vineyard classification.
Tours-sur-Marne is well known for its thriving crops of quality grapes which feed the nearby winery.

See also
Communes of the Marne department
Classification of Champagne vineyards
Montagne de Reims Regional Natural Park

References

Tourssurmarne
Grand Cru Champagne villages